The James H. Standish House is a historic house located at 54 Francis Street in Brookline, Massachusetts.

Built c. 1874–75, the -story house and carriage barn are rare surviving examples in Brookline of elaborate Stick style. It has Italianate massing and facade organization, as well as other typically Italianate elements such as a cupola and a bracketed and dentiled cornice. However, it also has applied Stick-style decoration above and below some of its windows.

The house was listed on the National Register of Historic Places on October 17, 1985.

See also
 National Register of Historic Places listings in Brookline, Massachusetts

References

Houses in Brookline, Massachusetts
Queen Anne architecture in Massachusetts
Italianate architecture in Massachusetts
Houses completed in 1874
National Register of Historic Places in Brookline, Massachusetts
Houses on the National Register of Historic Places in Norfolk County, Massachusetts